Dave W. Mulder (born February 17, 1939) is an American politician and educator who served as a member of the Iowa Senate for the 2nd District from 2005 to 2009.

Early life and education 
Mulder was born in Alton, Iowa. He received his B.S. from Morningside College and his M.A. and Ed.D. from the University of South Dakota. Mulder also took graduate courses at Oklahoma State University–Stillwater, the University of Nebraska–Lincoln, and the Wisconsin School of Business.

Career 
Mulder has worked as a professor and coach at Northwestern College in Orange City, Iowa since 1981.

During his tenure in the Iowa Senate, Mulder served on the Senate committee on Agriculture, Economic Growth, Human Resources, and Education committee, where he was the ranking member. He was elected in 2004 with 24,433 votes, running unopposed. Mulder was not a candidate in the 2008 Iowa Senate elections, and was succeeded by businessman Randy Feenstra.

During the 2016 Republican Party presidential primaries, Mulder endorsed Wisconsin governor Scott Walker. Mulder later became a part of Walker's leadership team in Iowa.

Personal life 
Mulder and his wife, Dorothy, have two children. They reside in Sioux Center, Iowa.

References

External links
Iowa General Assembly - Senator Dave Mulder
Project Vote Smart - Dave W. Mulder profile
Follow the Money - Dave Mulder
2006 2004 campaign contributions

Republican Party Iowa state senators
Living people
1939 births
American people of Dutch descent
Morningside University alumni
University of South Dakota alumni
People from Alton, Iowa
Northwestern College (Iowa) faculty